Sir William Dunbar, 7th Baronet (2 March 1812 – 17 December 1889) was a Scottish Liberal Member of Parliament in the British House of Commons.

Life
He was born on 2 March 1812 the son of James Dunbar and his wife, Anna Catharina van Reed d'Oudtshoorn.

He was educated at the University of Edinburgh. He became a member of the Faculty of Advocates in 1835, but did not practise law.

He became the 7th Baronet on 22 June 1841 on the death of his paternal uncle, who died without a male heir.

In 1850 he was living at 47 Heriot Row in central Edinburgh.

He was appointed a Lord of the Treasury in 1859. He became Keeper of the Privy Seal to the Prince of Wales. Dunbar left Parliament in 1865 to become Commissioner for Auditing Public Accounts. He was Comptroller and Auditor General 1867–1888.

He represented Wigtown Burghs 1857–1865.

Family

In 1842 he married Catherine Hay Paterson (d.1890). His eldest son Uthred James Hay Dunbar became 8th baronet and on his death in 1904, being childless, the baronetcy passed to the second son, William Cospatrick Dunbar (1844–1931).

References

Who's Who of British Members of Parliament: Volume I 1832-1885, edited by M. Stenton (The Harvester Press 1976)

External links 
 

1812 births
1889 deaths
Dunbar, William, 7th Baronet
Members of the Parliament of the United Kingdom for Scottish constituencies
Scottish Liberal Party MPs
UK MPs 1857–1859
UK MPs 1859–1865
Members of the Faculty of Advocates
Civil servants in the Audit Office (United Kingdom)